Canarium strictum, known by common names including black dhup, Raal, Raal dhup and black dammar, is a species of tree in the family Burseraceae (the incense tree family). It is known for the medicinal and commercial use of the resin it exudates, called black dammar.

Habit and habitat
It is found in moist deciduous to semi-evergreen forests. The leaves of this large canopy tree are bipinnate.

References

Further reading

strictum